The U.S. state of Alabama is home to 93 indigenous reptile species, not including subspecies.  Indigenous species include one species of crocodilian, 12 lizard species, 49 snake species, and 31 turtle species.  Three native species have possibly been extirpated from the state.  These include the eastern indigo snake, southern hognose snake and the mimic glass lizard.

There are four known introduced reptile species, all lizards.  They include the Indo-Pacific gecko, brown anole, Texas horned lizard, and Mediterranean house gecko.

Human predation and habitat destruction has placed several reptile species and subspecies at risk of extirpation or extinction.  The Alabama Department of Conservation and Natural Resources lists the conservation status of each species within the state with a rank of lowest, low, moderate, high, and highest concern.

Alligator

Lizards

Snakes
Alabama is home to sixty-six known snake species and subspecies.  There are nine snake species and subspecies that are venomous to humans in the state.  The remaining fifty-five species and subspecies pose no threat to humans.

Turtles
Alabama law makes it illegal to take, sell or possess turtles, turtle parts, or turtle eggs from the wild for commercial purposes.

References

Alabama
Reptiles